Neven du Mont may refer to:
 August Neven du Mont, German painter and aristocrat, the first foreign Master of Foxhounds in England
 Mark Neven du Mont, writer and aristocrat
 Alfred Neven DuMont, a German publisher and owner of publishing house M. DuMont Schauberg,
 Konstantin Neven DuMont, son of A. Neven DuMont and former publisher of Kölner Stadt-Anzeiger
 Chiquita Neven du Mont, German socialite, former fashion model and jewellery designer, mother of German actor Sky du Mont
 Sky du Mont, German actor
 Clemens Neven du Mont, German-born socialite and oldest son of German actor Sky du Mont.

German noble families
German publishing families
German newspaper publishing families